Derek Williams (15 June 1934 – May 2014) was a Welsh amateur footballer who appeared in the Football League for Oldham Athletic, Wrexham and Manchester City as a goalkeeper. He was capped by Wales at amateur level.

Personal life 
Williams attended Alun School.

Career statistics

References 

Welsh footballers
English Football League players
Wales amateur international footballers
Association football goalkeepers
1934 births
Sportspeople from Mold, Flintshire
2014 deaths
Pwllheli F.C. players
Manchester City F.C. players
Wrexham A.F.C. players
Mold Alexandra F.C. players
Oldham Athletic A.F.C. players

People educated at Alun School, Mold
Middlesex Wanderers A.F.C. players
Marine F.C. players